Doc Stewart may refer to:

Charles Stewart (ice hockey) (1895–1973), Canadian ice hockey player 
E. J. Stewart (1877–1929), American football, basketball, and baseball player